This article contains information about the literary events and publications of 1682.

Events
In London, the King's Company and the Duke's Company join to form the United Company of actors.
In Paris, the Bibliothèque Mazarine reopens at the Collège des Quatre-Nations.
In Japan, Ihara Saikaku's The Life of an Amorous Man (好色一代男, Kōshoku Ichidai Otoko, "The Man Who Spent His Life in Love") inaugurates what becomes known as ukiyo-zōshi ("books of the floating world"), the first major genre of popular Japanese fiction.

New books

Prose
John Bunyan – The Holy War
Francisco Nunez de Cepeda – Idea del buen pastor representada en Empresas sacras
William Penn
Frame of Government of Pennsylvania
Some Fruits of Solitude In Reflections And Maxims
Mary Rowlandson – A Narrative of the Captivity and Restoration of Mrs. Mary Rowlandson
Ihara Saikaku (井原 西鶴) – The Life of an Amorous Man (好色一代男 Kōshoku Ichidai Otoko)
Bulstrode Whitelocke – Memorials of the English Affairs from the Beginning of the Reign of Charles I (Puritan viewpoint)

Children and young people
Dorcas Dole – Salutation and Seasonable Exhortation to Children (by a Quaker)

Drama
 Anonymous – Mr. Turbulent 
John Banks – The Unhappy Favourite, or the Earl of Essex
John Banks – Vertue Betray'd
John Dryden – MacFlecknoe
John Dryden and Nathaniel Lee – The Duke of Guise
Thomas d'Urfey
The Injured Princess (adapted from Cymbeline)
The Royalist
Thomas Otway –  Venice Preserv'd
William Shakespeare adapted by Nahum Tate –  Coriolanus
Thomas Southerne – The Persian Prince, or the Loyal Brother
Pedro Calderon de la Barca – Verdadera V parte de comedias

Poetry
Nahum Tate (probable) – Absalom and Achitophel, part 2

Births
 October 2 – Birgitte Christine Kaas, Norwegian poet and translator (died 1761) 
 October 29 – Pierre François Xavier de Charlevoix, French historian (died 1761)
Unknown date – Jacopo Facciolati, Paduan lexicographer and philologist (died 1769)

Deaths
March 12 – Francis Sempill, Scottish poet and wit (born c. 1616)
October 19 – Sir Thomas Browne, English polymath and poet (born 1605)
November 14 – Rijcklof van Goens, Governor-General of the Dutch East Indies 1678-1681 and travel writer (born 1619)
Unknown dates 
Philip Hunton, English clergyman and political writer (born c. 1600)
Francisco Núñez de Pineda y Bascuñán, Chilean writer and soldier (born 1607 in literature)

References

 
Years of the 17th century in literature